My Boss's Daughter is a 2003 American comedy film directed by David Zucker. It stars Ashton Kutcher, Tara Reid and Terence Stamp. The film revolves around a man housesitting for his boss and getting into various hijinks with the people who come over to his place. My Boss's Daughter received negative reviews from critics and was a box office flop, grossing $18 million worldwide against a production budget of $14 million (not including advertising and distribution costs).

It was Charlotte Zucker's final film role before her death on September 5, 2007.

Plot 
Tom Stansfield is a researcher at a publishing company who works under the tyrannical Jack Taylor. Tom has a crush on his boss' daughter, Lisa, who is completely controlled by her overprotective father. 

Lisa reveals to Tom that her father is making her house-sit the same night as a party she wants to attend, so he convinces her to stand up to her father and attend the party anyway. Lisa asks him to come to their house that night, leading Tom to think that she has invited him to the party; in reality, she just wants him to fill in for her - he reluctantly agrees.

A comedy of errors ensues, including the return of Lisa's older brother Red, on the run from drug dealers. He dumps drugs into the toilet, and instead returns a bag of flour to the drug dealer. 

One of Tom's tasks is to guard their owl, O-J, which lives in an open cage (it has not been able to fly due to a deep depression, from the loss of a prior mate). When the bird drinks from the toilet polluted with drugs, it flies away. Jack's ex-secretary Audrey goes to the house to try to earn her job back. After fighting with her boyfriend, she stays over at the house.

Lisa returns home after finding out that her boyfriend Hans is cheating on her. Tom hides everything that happened and she spends some time with him thinking he is gay. He clarifies to her that he's actually straight and she starts to like him. Audrey's friend thinks she has breast cancer and asks Tom to feel her breasts. Lisa walks in on them and is disgusted.

T.J., the drug dealer, discovers the 'drugs' he collected earlier was actually flour, so he threatens to kill Tom if he doesn't return his money. T.J. tries to open a safe and steal the money. However, Tom gives him sleeping pills mixed with alcohol which sends him into a coma. 

As they think T.J. is dead, Audrey and her friends bury him. Later, T.J. escapes from the grave and threatens to kill Lisa. With Red's help, Tom rescues Lisa and she falls in love with him. He then goes to get her father, but on the way back the owl gets into the car making Tom lose control of the car and crash into the house. They find police officers in the house looking for T.J., who ends up getting arrested. 

Jack is enraged by the damages done to the house and throws Tom out. The next day, he hears his son explaining to Lisa how she should stand up to their father and go back to Tom. Jack realizes his mistakes and gives Tom a promotion.

Cast 
 Ashton Kutcher as Tom Stansfield
 Tara Reid as Lisa Taylor
 Terence Stamp as Jack Taylor Sr.
 Molly Shannon as Audrey Bennett
 Andy Richter as Jack "Red" Taylor Jr.
 Michael Madsen as T.J.
 Tyler Labine as "Spike"
 Jon Abrahams as Paul
 Patrick Crenshaw as Old Man Neighbor
 Angela Little as Sheryl
 David Koechner as Speed
 Carmen Electra as Tina
 Kenan Thompson as Hans
 Jeffrey Tambor as Ken
 Dave Foley as Henderson
 Charlotte Zucker as Gertrude

Release 
The movie was released by Dimension Films on August 22, 2003, opening at #10 at the U.S. Box office and grossed $4,855,798 on its opening weekend. It was released domestically in 2,206 theaters grossing $15,550,605 in the United States. The film was also released in foreign theaters, grossing a further $2,640,400 with its highest sales of $691,999 in Russia and its lowest sales in the Czech Republic, for a total of $18,191,005 worldwide.

Reception 
My Boss's Daughter garnered negative reviews from critics. The site's consensus states: "Offensive, incoherent, and ineptly acted and directed." Metacritic, which assigns a normalized rating out of 100 top reviews from mainstream critics, the film has an average score of 15, based on 19 reviews, indicating "overwhelming dislike".

Scott Tobias of The A.V. Club criticized Zucker's comedic timing of his stock-in-trade non-sequiturs and Kutcher's "sleepwalking" performance for failing to keep the rest of the cast grounded, calling it "an abysmal screwball comedy that relies heavily on idiocy from both sides of the screen." Elvis Mitchell of The New York Times called it a "muddled comedy of confusion" that delivers tasteless and outdated Farrelly brothers-style humor. Entertainment Weeklys Lisa Schwarzbaum gave the film an overall "F" grade. She criticized the "manic sloppiness" of the jokes from the supporting ensemble and Zucker's direction for feeling like "a substitute teacher soldiering through a day's work for a day's pay at a decertified school." Robert Koehler of Variety felt that Zucker broke a cardinal rule of making comedy look like a lot of work by misusing the comedic talents of his cast but concluded that: "Nonetheless, the movie looks and sounds reasonably good, particularly with Andrew Laws' crucial and shiny production design."

The film received three nominations at the 24th Golden Raspberry Awards including Worst Actor for Ashton Kutcher (also for Cheaper by the Dozen and Just Married), Worst Supporting Actress for Tara Reid and Worst Screen Couple for both Kutcher and Reid (also for Just Married with Brittany Murphy), but lost to Ben Affleck (Daredevil, Gigli and Paycheck), Demi Moore (Charlie's Angels: Full Throttle) and both Affleck and Jennifer Lopez (Gigli) respectively.

References

External links 
 
 
 

2000s American films
2000s English-language films
2003 films
2003 romantic comedy films
American romantic comedy films
Dimension Films films
Films directed by David Zucker (director)
Films scored by Teddy Castellucci
Films set in Chicago
Films shot in Vancouver